Cylindrosybra is a monotypic beetle genus in the family Cerambycidae described by Per Olof Christopher Aurivillius in 1922. Its single species, Cylindrosybra albomaculata, was described by the same author in the same year.

References

Apomecynini
Beetles described in 1922
Monotypic Cerambycidae genera